Elliot Hodge (born 17 January 1996) is an English professional footballer who plays as a midfielder for Hednesford Town. He is the son of former    Nottingham Forest footballer, Steve Hodge.

A former Notts County trainee, he signed with Lincoln City in February 2015. He played on loan at Stamford, Gainsborough Trinity, Stafford Rangers and A.F.C. Telford United, before he rejoined Notts County in August 2017.

Playing career

Lincoln City
Hodge completed a scholarship at Notts County, before he signing with Lincoln City on a short-term contract 2 February 2015 after impressing manager Chris Moyses on trial. He signed a new one-year contract the following month. He made his first-team debut on 25 April, in a 0–0 draw at Dartford.

He joined Northern Premier League Premier Division side Stamford on loan and made his debut in a 3–1 defeat at Frickley Athletic on 14 November 2015. He scored his first goal in senior football on 26 January, in a 4–1 Doodson Cup victory over Buxton at the Zeeco Stadium. He made a total of 12 appearances for the "Daniels", scoring one goal. On 23 February 2016, he joined National League North club Gainsborough Trinity on loan. He played five matches for the "Holy Blues", before returning to Sincil Bank. He played nine games for the "Imps" across the 2015–16 campaign.

Hodge returned to the Northern Premier League Premier Division on an initial one-month loan at Stafford Rangers on 9 September 2016. He returned to the National League North on a one-month loan at A.F.C. Telford United in December. He played 15 games for the "Bucks" to help Telford to a 17th-place finish at the end of the 2016–17 season, whilst he also featured twice for parent club Lincoln, who achieved promotion to the English Football League as champions of the National League. He was released by Lincoln manager Danny Cowley in June 2017.

Notts County
On 1 August 2017, Hodge re-signed with Notts County of EFL League Two after impressing manager Kevin Nolan on trial.

Hodge joined Alfreton Town on a month-long loan deal on 22 January 2018.

He was released by Notts County at the end of the 2017–18 season.

Style of play
Speaking in August 2017, Hodge said that "my best quality is probably my pace, and being a winger I like to stay out wide, I like to be in one-v-one situations against the defender, but I am more than happy doing dog work too".

Career statistics

References

1996 births
Living people
Footballers from Nottingham
English footballers
Association football midfielders
Lincoln City F.C. players
Stamford A.F.C. players
Gainsborough Trinity F.C. players
Stafford Rangers F.C. players
AFC Telford United players
Notts County F.C. players
Alfreton Town F.C. players
Burton Albion F.C. players
Leamington F.C. players
Kettering Town F.C. players
Hednesford Town F.C. players
Northern Premier League players
National League (English football) players
English Football League players